The following lists events that happened during 1956 in Laos.

Incumbents
Monarch: Sisavang Vong 
Prime Minister: Katay Don Sasorith (until 21 March), Souvanna Phouma (starting 21 March)

Events

August
date unknown - A coalition government between the Pathet Lao and National Progressive Party (Laos) is formed.

References

 
1950s in Laos
Years of the 20th century in Laos
Laos
Laos